Amphidromus fuscolabris is a species of air-breathing land snail, a terrestrial pulmonate gastropod mollusk in the family Camaenidae.

Distribution
Distribution of Amphidromus fuscolabris include Sekong Province and Champasak Province in Laos.

Description

References

External links 
 https://biodiversitylibrary.org/page/28228483

fuscolabris
Gastropods described in 1898